Binduga may refer to the following places:
Binduga, Łosice County in Masovian Voivodeship (east-central Poland)
Binduga, Przasnysz County in Masovian Voivodeship (east-central Poland)
Binduga, Pomeranian Voivodeship (north Poland)
Binduga, Warmian-Masurian Voivodeship (north Poland)